The 1926–27 Polska Liga Hokejowa season was the first season of the Polska Liga Hokejowa, the top level of ice hockey in Poland. Three teams participated in the final round, and AZS Warszawa won the championship.

Qualification
 KS Cracovia - Pogoń Lwów 0:3

Final round

External links
 Season on hockeyarchives.info

Polska Hokej Liga seasons
Polska
1926–27 in Polish ice hockey